Russell Ward (born 30 August 1982) is a New Zealand male skeleton racer, who has competed as an individual and member of the New Zealand team at World Cup level.
He is currently coaching the New Zealand men's skeleton team.

World Cup 2005/2006 results 
36th on 10 November 2005, Calgary, CAN
DNS on 17 November 2005, Lake Placid, New York, U.S.

References

1982 births
Living people
New Zealand male skeleton racers